Vibrate You is the debut studio album by King Adora. It was released on 21 May 2001 on Superior Quality Recordings and reached number 30 on the UK Albums Chart. Produced by John Cornfield at Sawmills Studios in Cornwall, the album received mixed to negative reviews from critics upon its release.

Background

Writing and recording 
Writing for the album began when Matt Browne and Martyn Nelson formed King Adora in Birmingham, England in 1998. The first song the pair wrote was Friday Night Explodes, which explored their experiences of working all week and getting "trashed" every Friday night. After signing to Superior Quality Recordings in 2000, the band released the Bionic/The Law, Big Isn't Beautiful and Smoulder singles, playing the singles and other newly written songs at their live shows. An attempt at recording the album was halted at the request of Superior Quality Recordings due to the band's drunkenness, resulting in the decision to send the band to the secluded Sawmills Studios in Cornwall in late 2000. John Cornfield was chosen to produce and mix the record. The surroundings at Sawmills proved to be a welcome change of pace for the band, finding inspiration from images on the walls of the studio's previous clients (The Stone Roses, Muse, The Verve) and putting on a Christmas party, which was featured in Melody Maker.

According to Browne, the album took "six or seven weeks" to record. The band arrived at the studio with the majority of the songs already written and arranged. Ten songs recorded in the sessions are present on the album, with previous singles Bionic, The Law and Big Isn't Beautiful (originally recorded and produced by Chris Sheldon) being re-recorded, to add "a little bit more balls". Smoulder was unchanged from its single version, which had been produced and mixed by John Cornfield. Cornfield recalled that the band were "pretty good at getting themselves vibed up, into it and going for it" and that he tried to push them into more of an "angry rock" direction, away from their glam roots. An "Elvis impression" was included on We Are Heroes, allegedly without the band knowing. The Mevo Gissey Choir was used on Music Takes You, with the band stating "we were going to get a big gospel choir in and try some other things, but we said we wanted something really powerful and deep". Bassist Robbie Grimmit commented that the song was "our rock epic". Future single Suffocate was written during the sessions and dealt with the death of Browne's girlfriend. Dabrowski revealed the band "tried" to record cover versions at the sessions. Two previously released b-sides were included on an enhanced version of the album as bonus tracks. The enhanced version also included an EPK (featuring home video footage) and music videos for Big Isn't Beautiful, Smoulder, Suffocate and Bionic. The album was mastered by Kevin Metcalfe at The Soundmasters, London.

Musical style and influences 
The band's style on the album is rooted in glam rock, punk rock and hard rock. The band members credited Pavement, Sonic Youth, Pixies as the bands that made them want to be musicians, also stating "we had a fascination with the New York scene in the 70s going all the way up to the grunge scene". The band pointed out that their sound was a combination of their four personalities, saying "when we used to rehearse, it was whatever comes naturally on stage, just do it. If we ever wrote a song that was three and a half minutes, we'd rehearse it twice and think 'this is so boring and long'. So we'd get rid of choruses and just make it more immediate". The music press noted elements of Guns N' Roses, Mötley Crüe, Alice Cooper, T-Rex, David Bowie, Blondie and early Manic Street Preachers in the band's music. The band also added "futuristic electro-elements" to their sound. Drum machines were present on the album, featuring on Aftertime, The Law, We Are Heroes, Music Takes You and Suffocate. Synthesisers featured on Friday Night Explodes and We Are Heroes, while a police siren sample was utilised on The Law.

Title and themes 
The album title Vibrate You is taken from the lyrics of the opening track, Smoulder. Themes present on the album include sex, drugs, rock 'n' roll, relationships, self-obsession, sleaze and anorexia. Browne stated that Big Isn't Beautiful "was from the point of view from an anorexic male. It's quite honest, but because it's controversial, people get a bit angry about it". The band described Friday Night Explodes as being "a speed and alcohol fuelled celebration of excess, placing drugs on their rightful pedestal. A sort of pre-band autobiography". Bionic, Aftertime, We Are Heroes and Music Takes You celebrated the bond between the band members and their fans. Many of the songs dealt with various forms of sex, including The Law ("sex with a policewoman"), Supermuffdiver (oral sex) and Asthmatic (auto-erotic asphyxiation). Whether is "anti-machismo", "anti-lad culture" and "about feeling comfortable in expressing yourself". Smoulder and Suffocate explored relationships filled with despair, fear and desire.

Reception

The album received mixed reviews, the Southern Reporter commenting "how can you quibble at a band who expend more energy in 40 minutes than Pink Floyd did in a career? What's more it's not wasted effort". The NME's review was mixed, Steven Wells stating that "to send King Adora over the top with a record like this would be tantamount to murder". Drowned In Sound were less positive, rating the album 4/10. Allmusic gave the album 2.5/5, saying the band were "in danger of riding off into the sunset as the neo-glam indie equivalent of the Rutles". The Guardian were negative, stating "the Adora (who named themselves after a vibrator) are too tentative to carry off either the look or the sound".

Legacy 
Matt Browne would look back on the album with disdain in the years following its release, saying "I probably would have used different recording techniques, possibly included a couple of different songs, some songs I didn’t feel were that strong and the artwork I absolutely loathed". He also went on to say that "songs like Whether and Aftertime could have been brought out better. They’re both good songs, but I feel they could have been made a lot heavier. I don’t feel (John Cornfield) who produced it really got to grips with those songs".

Track listing

Enhanced CD bonus tracks

Personnel
Matt Browne – vocals, guitar
Martyn Nelson – guitar, backing vocals
Robbie Grimmit – bass
Dan Dabrowski – drums
Mevo Gissey Choir – vocals on Music Takes You

Production
Tracks 1, 2, 3, 4, 5, 6, 7, 8, 9, 10, 11, 12 – Produced and mixed by John Cornfield
Track 13 – Produced by King Adora, engineered by John Rivers and Mark Thomas
 Track 14 – Produced by King Adora and Dan Sprigg, mixed by Dan Sprigg and Jamie Travers, engineered by Mark Thomas

Singles
2000: Big Isn't Beautiful (31 July 2000)
 2000: Smoulder (23 October 2000)
 2001: Suffocate (19 February 2001)
2001: Bionic (14 May 2001)

Tour

King Adora began their tour supporting Vibrate You in late January 2001 and wrapped up in mid-December. The biggest headlining show of the tour came on 19 May, when demand forced the band's London gig to be moved from the Mean Fiddler to the Astoria. Setlists for the tour consisted of material from Vibrate You, with b-sides also receiving airplay, including Scream And Shout, Don't Trust The Ones You Love, Freak, Aceface and White Noise Babies. Music Takes You was the only song from the album not played on the tour. New songs were premiered later in the tour (including Born To Lose, Love So Volatile, Asleep and Come) and would see release on the band's second album Who Do You Love? in 2004. Other new songs played on the tour, but never officially released, included The Chase and Tokyo Honey.

 1^ Venue upgraded from Mean Fiddler.
 2^ Rescheduled from 8 May 2001.
 3^ T In The Park.
 4^ Edinburgh Festival Fringe.
 5^ Summer Sonic Festival.
 6^ Reading Festival.
 7^ Leeds Festival.
 8^ Gig On The Green.
 9^ BBC Radio 1 One Live in Birmingham.

References

2001 albums
King Adora albums